"Let That Pony Run" is a song written by Gretchen Peters and recorded by American country music artist Pam Tillis. It was released in January 1993 as the second single from the album Homeward Looking Angel.  The song reached number 4 on the Billboard Hot Country Singles & Tracks chart.

Content
The song is a ballad about a woman named Mary, who relocates to West Virginia and rebuilds her life following a divorce from her husband, who confesses to having an affair.

Music video
The music video was directed by Steven Goldmann and premiered in early 1993.

Chart performance

Year-end charts

References

1993 singles
Pam Tillis songs
Songs written by Gretchen Peters
Song recordings produced by Paul Worley
Arista Nashville singles
Music videos directed by Steven Goldmann
1992 songs